Adams of Eagle Lake is an American hour-long police series that aired on ABC in 1975.  Andy Griffith starred as Chief of Police Sam Adams and the episodes presented his attempts to maintain the law in a small resort town.  The show lasted for two episodes.

Background
In 1974, Griffith starred in Winter Kill, a television movie that was intended as a series pilot.  When it failed to sell, the main character of Sheriff Sam McNeill was renamed and used as the lead character in Adams of Eagle Lake.

Cast and characters
Andy Griffith as Sheriff Sam Adams
Abby Dalton as Margaret Kelly
Nick Nolte as Officer Jerry Troy
Iggie Wolfington as Officer Jubal Hammond
Paul Winchell as Monty
Sheldon Allman as Quinn
Eldon Quick as Leonard
William Mims as Lucas Pratt
Peter Coffield as Jimmy Simpkins
Scott Marlowe as Ron Selleck
Lynne Marta as Cindy
Brenda Scott as Debbie
Irene Tedrow as Grandma Simpkins
Jack Dodson as Doc Russell

Episodes
"Home is the Coward" (January 10, 1975)
"Treasure Chest Murder" (February 26, 1975)

Locations
Although supposedly set in northern California, the TV series location showed opening scenes and other outdoor shots actually taken from the southern California mountain resort communities of Big Bear Lake and Fawnskin, which were much closer to Los Angeles area television production studios.

Later version
In 1977, Griffith appeared in two additional television movies (The Girl in the Empty Grave and Deadly Game), both attempts to make use again of the same concept.  Griffith's character was now Chief of Police Abel Marsh, but he was still a lawman in a small town near a lake.  Both movies were filmed in Big Bear Lake, California. These movies, as well as Adams of Eagle Lake and Isn't It Shocking? (1973) before it, were based on writer Lane Slate's 1972 feature film They Only Kill Their Masters

References

External links

Adams of Eagle Lake at TVShowsOnDVD.com

American Broadcasting Company original programming
1975 American television series debuts
1975 American television series endings
1970s American crime drama television series
Television series by MGM Television